Ymer Abili (born 14 January 2009) is an Australian soccer player who plays for Oakleigh Cannons as a goalkeeper.

Career
Abili made his senior debut at the age of 13 in September 2022, appearing for Oakleigh Cannons in the Australia Cup.

References

External links
 Ymir Abili at Gameday

2009 births
Living people
Australian soccer players
Oakleigh Cannons FC players
Association football goalkeepers